Lorenzo Wilson Milam, born on August 2, 1933, in Jacksonville, Florida; died on July 19, 2020 in Puerto Escondido, Oaxaca, Mexico, was an American writer and activist who was instrumental in starting many of the first listener-supported community radio stations in the United States, beginning with KRAB in Seattle in 1962.

Early life
In 1952, at age 19, he was diagnosed with polio. His sister died of the disease on December 29, 1952, but Milam's case was milder and he was able to walk with crutches after one year. This and the aftermath are described in his autobiographical book "The Cripple Liberation Front Marching Band Blues."

Community radio
Milam is credited with helping start 14 stations from the early 1960s through late 1970s. He got his start in radio volunteering in 1958–1959 at Lew Hill's KPFA in Berkeley, California. He used a $15,000 inheritance to buy a small FM transmitter in 1959 and spent the next 3 years seeking a broadcasting license "anywhere in the US" from the Federal Communications Commission (FCC), which assigned him a frequency in Seattle, 107.7FM. With the help of volunteer engineer Jeremy Lansman he was able to get his antique Collins Radio transmitter on the air in 1962, creating the station KRAB.

Milam and Lansman later assisted in the creation of community radio stations around the country, starting in 1968 with KBOO (1968-1971) in Portland; KTAO (1968-1974); KDNA (St. Louis) 1969-72; KPOO (1972-) San Francisco;, KCHU, 1975-77; KFAT (1975-1983) Gilroy, California; WORT; WRFG 89.3 FM (Atlanta, Georgia); KOPN 89.5 FM (Columbia, Missouri); KZUM 89.3 FM (Lincoln, Nebraska).

The KRAB Nebula, was a tape exchange, using quarter-inch audio tape sent to stations, sharing programs.

According to David Armstrong in A Trumpet to Arms: Alternative Media in America, "Milam's passion for community radio--and 1.1 million from the sale of a second station, KDNA-St.Louis, to commercial broadcasters in 1973--led him to become a veritable Johnny Appleseed of community radio."

Sex and Broadcasting 
Milam authored the 1971 book Sex and Broadcasting, A Handbook on Starting a Radio Station for the Community.

The "godless" petition 
In December 1974, Milam and Jeremy Lansman, both radio broadcast consultants in California, sent a petition, RM-2493 to the Federal Communications Commission asking for a freeze on new licenses for educational television and radio channels, and an investigation into religious broadcasters. Although the agency did not consider the petition (on First Amendment grounds), the FCC received over a million letters, about 3,000 per day for many months, protesting the petition, the largest number of letters that the FCC has ever received on an issue.

The Fessenden Review
Milam published 13 issues of the print publication The Fessenden Review between 1985 and 1989. Content was eclectic to an extreme degree, and as likely to confound readers as to amuse them. Issues were released at successively longer intervals as finances dwindled, and later issues were irregularly numbered. Milam hoped that anyone chancing upon a copy at a newsstand would assume it was the current issue and buy it, and that confused dealers would be less likely to identify culls.

Ralph (journal)
Milam, as Publisher/Editor, produced 294 online issues, 1994-2019, of the online publication RALPH: The Review of Arts, Literature, Philosophy and the Humanities.

Books and publications
(this list is incomplete)
Milam, Lorenzo W. The Myrkin Papers. Bellevue, Wash: Duck Press, 1969. 
Milam, Lorenzo W. Everything You've Ever Wanted to Know About Radio and Television (Which Your Friendly Local Broadcaster Would NEVER Tell You...), The Realist.  1971.Paul Krassner, Editor
Milam, Lorenzo W. Sex and Broadcasting
Milam, Lorenzo W. Sex and Broadcasting. 1971, Saratoga, CA: Dildo Press 36 pages
Milam, Lorenzo W. Sex and Broadcasting. 1972 73 pages
Milam, Lorenzo W. Sex and Broadcasting: A Handbook on Starting a Radio Station for the Community. Los Gatos, Calif.: Dildo Press, 1975. 
Milam, Lorenzo W. The Original Sex and Broadcasting: A Handbook on Starting a Radio Station for the Community. San Diego, CA: Mho & Mho Works, 1988. 
Milam, Lorenzo W. Sex and Broadcasting. 2017
Milam, Lorenzo W. The Cripple Liberation Front Marching Band Blues. San Diego, CA: Mho & Mho Works, 1984. 
The Fessenden Review (as Publisher/Editor: 13 issues) Circa 1988-1994
 
The Lourdes of Arizona (as Carlos A. Amantea), 1989
The Lourdes of Psychotherapy : The 1985 Evolution of Pscyhotherapy Conference Revealed, 2005 Limited Edition
The Blob That Ate Oaxaca and Other Travel Tales (as Carlos Amantea) 1992
Milam, Lorenzo W. Cripzen: A Manual for Survival. San Diego, CA: Mho & Mho Works, 1993. 
RALPH: The Review of Arts, Literature, Philosophy and the Humanities (as Publisher/Editor; 294 online issues), 1994-2019
Gallant, Jonathan A, and Lorenzo W. Milam. Gringolándia: A Guide for Puzzled Mexicans. San Diego, CA: Mho & Mho Works, 1997. 
A Cricket in the Telephone (At Sunset): Poems from the Fessenden Review (as Lolita Lark, editor), 1998
Lorenzo Wilson Milam: Life Among The Walkies. San Diego, CA: Mho & Mho Works, 2018.

Notes

Links
KRAB Archive (Audio, program guides, photos, and history)

American broadcasters
1933 births
2020 deaths